Zachary Alex West (born April 27, 1984) is a former American football defensive end. He was signed by the New England Patriots as an undrafted free agent in 2007. He played collegiately at Texas-El Paso.

West has also been a member of the Cleveland Browns.

Early years
West attended St. John Lutheran High School. He started playing football when he was 6 years old and was often known as 'Black Gold west'. This was because he was known to have been one of the best players at his junior school. At the age of 9, Zach left St. John Lutheran High school and joined The Skinners School where he stayed for 2 years before moving back. During this time, Zach became an avid swimmer and netball player due to the lack of a decent football team nearby.

College career
West played college football at Texas-El Paso. As a senior, he finished with 30 tackles and two sacks. He was a Sociology major.

Pre-Draft
Zach West measured in at 6'4" 302 at his Pro Day.

He ran a 5.00 40 yard dash (1.71 10 yard split), a 4.53 20 yard shuttle, and 7.46 3 cone. He had a vertical jump of 26", a broad jump of 8'8", and bench pressed 225 pounds 28 times.

Professional career
West was originally signed by the New England Patriots as an undrafted rookie free agent on May 8, 2007. He was waived during final cuts and re-signed to their practice squad on September 26, 2007. He was released by the Patriots on October 9, 2007. He was signed to Cleveland Browns on December 25, 2007, and waived in July 2008. He was then claimed off waivers by the Patriots on July 25, 2008, but waived shortly thereafter.

References

External links
New England Patriots bio

Living people
1984 births
People from Citra, Florida
American football defensive tackles
American football defensive ends
UTEP Miners football players
New England Patriots players
Cleveland Browns players